Järvenpää is a Finnish surname. Notable people with the surname include:

Anni Järvenpää (born 2000), Finnish figure skater
Hannu Järvenpää (born 1963), Finnish ice hockey player and coach
Juha Järvenpää (born 1989), Finnish ice hockey player
, singer of the Finnish band Leningrad Cowboys
Tero Järvenpää (born 1984), Finnish javelin thrower

Finnish-language surnames